= Ferlacher Badesee =

- Location within Austria
- Location: Carinthia, Austria
- Coordinates: 46.5453°N 14.2833°E
- Type: lake

Ferlacher Badesee is a lake of Carinthia, Austria.
